Anthony Robert Lindsay, 30th Earl of Crawford and 13th Earl of Balcarres (born 24 November 1958), styled Lord Balniel between 1975 and 2023, is a Scottish peer and Chief of Clan Lindsay.

Life
Lindsay was born on 24 November 1958, the son of Robert Alexander Lindsay, 29th Earl of Crawford and Ruth Beatrice Meyer-Bechtler. He was educated at Eton College and at the University of Edinburgh.

Lindsay works as an investment banker in London.

Following his father's death on 18 March 2023 he became Earl of Crawford and Chief of Clan Lindsay. The earldom is one of the most ancient titles in Great Britain.

Family
He married Nicola A. Bicket, daughter of Captain Antony Neilson Bicket, on 12 August 1989. They have four children.

Alexander Thomas Lindsay, Lord Balniel (born 5 August 1991)
Hon. James Antony Lindsay (born 10 November 1992)
Hon. Katherine Ruth Vere Lindsay (born 4 September 1996)
Hon. Isabel Rosemary Lindsay (born 1 May 2001)

His eldest son Alexander is heir apparent to the earldom.

Arms

References

External links

1958 births
Living people
Scottish clan chiefs
British investment bankers
30
Earls of Balcarres
Anthony
People educated at Eton College
Alumni of the University of Edinburgh